Mihai Alexandru Neicuțescu (born 29 September 1998) is a Romanian professional footballer who plays as a centre forward for Gloria Buzău.

He became Romanian champion with Dinamo U19, in 2017.

Career Statistics

Club

Honours
Chindia Târgoviște
Liga II: 2018–19

References

External links
 
 

1998 births
Living people
Footballers from Bucharest
Romanian footballers
Association football forwards
Liga I players
FC Dinamo București players
Liga II players
AFC Chindia Târgoviște players
FC Gloria Buzău players